David Joseph Young (born February 9, 1959) is a former American football tight end in the National Football League (NFL). He was drafted by the New York Giants in the second round of the 1981 NFL Draft. He played college football at Purdue.

Young also played for the Buffalo Bills and Baltimore Colts / Indianapolis Colts.

References

1959 births
Living people
American football tight ends
All-American college football players
Purdue Boilermakers football players
New York Giants players
Buffalo Bills players
Baltimore Colts players
Indianapolis Colts players